The 2013–14 James Madison Dukes men's basketball team represented James Madison University during the 2013–14 NCAA Division I men's basketball season. The Dukes, led by sixth year head coach Matt Brady, played their home games at the James Madison University Convocation Center and were members of the Colonial Athletic Association. They finished the season 11–20, 6–10 in CAA play to finish in a tie for sixth place. They lost in the quarterfinals of the CAA tournament to Towson.

Roster

Schedule

|-
!colspan=9 style="background:#450084; color:#C2A14D;"| Exhibition

|-
!colspan=9 style="background:#450084; color:#C2A14D;"| Regular season

|-
!colspan=9 style="background:#450084; color:#C2A14D;"| 2014 CAA tournament

References

James Madison Dukes men's basketball seasons
James Madison
James Madison Dukes men's basketball team
James Madison Dukes men's basketball team